Live...in the Heart of the City is a 1980 live album by English rock band Whitesnake. Originally released as a double-vinyl album, and double-play cassette, it utilises recordings made in 1978 and 1980. The album charted at number 5 on the UK Albums Chart, and number 146 on the Billboard 200.

Release
Sides 1 and 2 of the vinyl are recordings made with the Rolling Stones Mobile Studio at the Hammersmith Odeon, during the band's 1980 World Tour. 

Sides 3 and 4 are from a 1978 recording, previously released in Japan in March 1980 as Live at Hammersmith.

In North America, the album was released as a single record, excluding the live material from 1978.

The first UK CD version (EMI CZD 94) was a double set, issued in 1988, in what is now known as a 'fat-boy' double-CD case. Sides 1 and 2 of the 2-LP set were CD1; sides 3 and 4 were CD2.

The later 1994 release was a single CD version, the 1978 recording of "Come On" being dropped to match the restrictive running time of the single CD.

Live...in the Heart of the City has since been remastered and was released in March 2007 as a 2-CD set (in a slimline double-CD case), once again featuring all the tracks of the original album, plus a 1980 recording of "Ain't No Love in the Heart of the City".

The 1978 performance of Might Just Take Your Life, originally recorded by singer David Coverdale and keyboardist Jon Lord as members of Deep Purple in 1974, featured guitarist Bernie Marsden singing the middle eight part as originally sung by Glenn Hughes on the Deep Purple recording.

The sleeve art is by British artist Jeff Cummins.

"We were sent on some silly promotional stunt for the album that involved a circus elephant," recalled David Coverdale. "Yes, an elephant, not a snake. Lord knows why."

Track listing

Live in the Heart of the City (23/24 June 1980)

Live at Hammersmith (23 November 1978)

Single CD version

Double CD version

Personnel

Whitesnake
David Coverdale – vocals
Micky Moody – guitar, backing vocals
Bernie Marsden – guitar, backing vocals, additional lead vocal on Might Just Take Your Life
Neil Murray – bass guitar
Ian Paice – drums on disc 1 recordings from 1980
Dave Dowle – drums on disc 2 recordings from 1978 (not credited in the original printing)
Jon Lord – keyboards

Production
Martin Birch – producer, engineer

Charts

Album

Singles

Certifications

References

Whitesnake live albums
Albums produced by Martin Birch
1980 live albums
Liberty Records live albums
Polydor Records live albums
United Artists Records live albums
Albums recorded at the Hammersmith Apollo
Live hard rock albums
Live blues rock albums
Mirage Records albums
Atlantic Records live albums